The 1973–74 NBA season was the 28th season of the National Basketball Association. The season ended with the Boston Celtics winning the NBA Championship, beating the Milwaukee Bucks 4 games to 3 in the NBA Finals.

Notable occurrences 
 The 1974 NBA All-Star Game was played at the Coliseum at Seattle Center in Seattle, with the West beating the East 134–123. Bob Lanier of the Detroit Pistons wins the game's MVP award.
 The Baltimore Bullets relocated to the Washington, D.C. suburb of Landover, Maryland and became the Capital Bullets.
 The NBA on CBS began. CBS' partnership with the NBA lasted 17 consecutive years, and ended in 1990, when NBC took over as the NBA's broadcast partner.
 Blocks and steals became officially recorded statistics for the first time. Elmore Smith of the Los Angeles Lakers led the league in blocks with 4.85 per game, which remains the third-highest average in league history.
 Bob McAdoo of the Buffalo Braves led the league in both points per game and field goal percentage, with averages of 30.6 and .547, respectively. He was the first player to do so since Wilt Chamberlain in 1965–66, and to date only one player has replicated the achievement: Shaquille O'Neal in 1999–2000.
 Earl Strom returns to officiating in the NBA following a four-year absence. Strom left the NBA for the American Basketball Association in 1969 over a salary dispute and officiated there for three seasons, then did not officiate at all in 1972–73. Strom will continue with the NBA through the 1989–90 season and earn enshrinement in the Naismith Basketball Hall of Fame in 1995.

Season recap
The NBA opened the year still very impressed with the New York Knicks' second-ever NBA title from a year ago. Much publicized, the team largely played this year as a victory lap, particularly after cornerstone Dave DeBusschere announced his pending retirement halfway through the season. Their opponent in three of the last four NBA Finals, the Los Angeles Lakers, also went through some key changes. Wilt Chamberlain had accepted an offer to be playing coach of the San Diego Conquistadors of the ABA. The Lakers, however, sued Chamberlain to prevent his playing in the ABA while still owing Los Angeles the option year of his contract. Chamberlain never played professional basketball again, and left most of his coaching duties in the ABA to assistant Stan Albeck, who went on to be a head coach in the NBA. Jerry West played just 31 games due to injury, and that likewise spelled the end to his nearly peerless career at guard. These two teams, which had led the league from two huge cities and carried the NBA to new media heights, were now poised to decline, which now gave strong runners-up from a year ago their chance to ascend.

There were no 60-win teams that season, but four teams did win over 50 games. Two of them, Milwaukee and Boston cast strong shadows all season long, each led by powerful individual forces determined to win.

Milwaukee won a league-most 59 of 82 NBA games, led again by superstar Kareem Abdul-Jabbar. Kareem had not seen the NBA Finals since the controversial changing of his name, but now had no Wilt Chamberlain to prevent his return. He averaged 27 points per game, making more field goals, 948, than any player in the league. The Bucks were again the top shooting team in the NBA and led in average margin of points over opponents as well. Second in minutes played and in the new blocked shots category, Abdul-Jabbar was a peerless presence all season long. One player, Atlanta's high-scoring Pete Maravich, had more shots, but Kareem sank his tries at a 53.9% clip, the second-best in the NBA. The rest of the Bucks lineup provided good support for Abdul-Jabbar, but age and injuries remained a concern into the playoffs.

The Boston Celtics cast a very determined shadow across the East with 56 wins, willed by 33-year-old team captain John Havlicek. The swingman star was again All-Defense while scoring 22.8 points per game. Hondo also leaked into the NBA's top assists category with six per game on average. However, more impressive than Havlicek was the intensity and standout play of 6' 9 245-pound center Dave Cowens. Cowens added 19 points per game and was second in the NBA in rebounds, leading the best board team in the league. Like Milwaukee's Abdul-Jabbar, he was a fixture in minutes played. But he was a star with a solid team around him, including guard Jo Jo White.

Milwaukee's 59 wins won the Midwest Division, but not by much. The Chicago Bulls and Detroit Pistons each again posted strong campaigns to finish second and third in the division, with the third and fourth-best records in the entire league.

Chicago, led by coach Dick Motta, followed the same formula of scoring from the forwards and strong defense overall. Forward Bob Love carried the team with an average of 21.8 points per game. The Bulls impressed all season long in being able to deny opponents easy shots with strong, clean defense that did not often foul. Cliff Ray stepped in for an injured Tom Boerwinkle and performed solidly. Jerry Sloan and Norm Van Lier were each in the top ten in the new steals category, Sloan ranking fourth in the NBA.

Detroit's hard-luck team showed some of its potential this year. Former player Ray Scott had taken over for Butch Van Breda Kolff's controversial mentorship and was now leading a winner. Bob Lanier emerged as the solid center with 22.5 points per game on 50% shooting and 13.3 rebounds with four assists per game. Bob also averaged three blocks a game. Former scoring champion Dave Bing was back, carrying his club with seven assists per game and adding 18.8 per game in scoring. Vision problems still dogged him, hampering what had once looked like a sure Hall Of Fame career. Detroit's 52 wins would have won the Pacific Division. Third in the Midwest, they simply hoped to be allowed into the playoffs.

Five other NBA teams won half their games to make a total of nine out of 17 total teams; there were no disasters like there had been a year ago. The playoff format took a closer look at records this year to answer criticisms of recent years past that had strongly tied playoff selections to the league's four divisions. It allowed some deserving teams to participate, which many were glad to see.

Final standings

By division

By conference

Notes
z, y – division champions
x – clinched playoff spot

Playoffs

Boston met 42–40 Buffalo in Round One, the Braves finishing as a third-place team in the Atlantic Division. The Braves were led by self-promoting superstar Bob McAdoo, the NBA's most dangerous shooter at 30.6 points per game and 54.7% accuracy, both tops in the NBA. The Big Mac was also among the NBA's top five rebounders and shot blockers, an impressive feat. Jack Ramsay's club was well-balanced and deep, with Ernie DiGregorio as the pure point guard to lead his offense. The six-game series was very close, with the last three games decided by three points or less. But Boston's defense gave them a series win four games to two.

The aging Knicks had dropped to 49 wins to finish second in the Atlantic, and again drew the Bullets as their first playoff opponents --- the Capital City Bullets. Washington, D.C. was slyly and slowly taking over Baltimore's team. But the 47-win Bullets were still largely the same bunch. Elvin Hayes and Phil Chenier were the team stars this year, with Wes Unseld battling knee injuries. Hayes had stepped up to lead the NBA in rebounds. The 6'10 240-pounder was also a leading shot blocker, while Chenier proved to be one of the league's best all-around guards at both ends of the floor. Now coached by former Celtic K.C. Jones, the team gave the Knicks a tough full-seven game series, but the outcome was the same. Game Four went to overtime and Game Five ended 106–105, both Knick wins. Boston and New York were now set for another huge East final.

Milwaukee met the 47-win Los Angeles Lakers, winners of the Pacific, in the first round, but these were now different Lakers. Elmore Smith had come over from Buffalo to lead the league in blocks. Connie Hawkins had come over from Phoenix, and Happy Hairston was back on the boards. Gail Goodrich continued to bewilder critics with a 25.3 scoring average, trying and making more free throws than any other NBA player at an 86% clip. Like the Knicks, the Lakers were deep and smart. And old. The Bucks blew them out for a 4–1 series win which signaled a clear change between the two teams in their rich rivalry.

Chicago got to meet Detroit in a seven-game war, using their fourth home game to barely survive the Pistons. Five of the seven games were decided by five points or less, all hotly competitive. Bob Lanier tried mightily to make up for his forwards, but the all-star fell just short. Milwaukee and Chicago kept that Midwest theme alive in the second round for the West final.

Boston made it plain they would not play around with New York this year, with two big double-digit romps to start the series. The Knicks, clearly now led by their stellar backcourt of Walt Frazier and Earl Monroe, showed some heart by beating Boston in Boston in Game Three. But that proved a final parting shot for the New Yorkers who had been in three of the last four NBA Finals. Havlicek made sure of that almost single-handedly, leading a 4–1 series win.

Chicago's forwards and guards appeared to outplay Milwaukee for four games. But Ray was no match for Abdul-Jabbar at center, and coach Larry Costello's team got a good bench boost as well to pound the Bulls in four straight. Only Game Two in Chicago had been close. Kareem was just as determined as Havlicek.

Milwaukee was favored in the NBA Finals, with Cowens looking up at the 7' 2 Abdul-Jabbar. But the Boston center conceded nothing, averaging 20 points and 13 rebounds in courageous play. The series would be a classic, going the full seven games. Kareem got some solid help in the shooting of Bobby Dandridge and the passing of 35-year-old Oscar Robertson. But the Celtics hung tough, even after losing 102–101 in a legendary double-overtime affair at Boston Garden that saw Abdul-Jabbar throw in a 15-foot hook shot to win the game at the buzzer.

Game Seven in Milwaukee saw the Bucks poised to win their second title in four years. But Cowens turned in a huge 28-point game with aggressive defense to push the Celtics to a 102–87 upset. Havlicek had averaged 27 points and six assists in 18 playoff games to win his first NBA title ring without Bill Russell. But it was Cowens, who had saved his best game for last, who stood out most in proving he was in fact center enough to lead an NBA champion past the taller giants of the league.

Statistics leaders

NBA awards
Most Valuable Player: Kareem Abdul-Jabbar, Milwaukee Bucks
Rookie of the Year: Ernie DiGregorio, Buffalo Braves
Coach of the Year: Ray Scott, Detroit Pistons

All-NBA First Team:
F – Rick Barry, Golden State Warriors
F – John Havlicek, Boston Celtics
C – Kareem Abdul-Jabbar, Milwaukee Bucks
G – Walt Frazier, New York Knicks
G – Gail Goodrich, Los Angeles Lakers

All-NBA Second Team:
F – Elvin Hayes, Capital Bullets
F – Spencer Haywood, Seattle SuperSonics
C – Bob McAdoo, Buffalo Braves
G – Dave Bing, Detroit Pistons
G – Norm Van Lier, Chicago Bulls

All-NBA Rookie Team:
Ernie DiGregorio, Buffalo Braves
Nick Weatherspoon, Capital Bullets
Mike Bantom, Phoenix Suns
John Brown, Atlanta Hawks
Ron Behagen, Kansas City-Omaha Kings

NBA All-Defensive First Team:
Dave DeBusschere, New York Knicks
John Havlicek, Boston Celtics
Kareem Abdul-Jabbar, Milwaukee Bucks
Norm Van Lier, Chicago Bulls
Walt Frazier, New York Knicks (tie)
Jerry Sloan, Chicago Bulls (tie)

NBA All-Defensive Second Team:
Elvin Hayes, Capital Bullets
Bob Love, Chicago Bulls
Nate Thurmond, Golden State Warriors
Don Chaney, Boston Celtics
Dick Van Arsdale, Phoenix Suns (tie)
Jim Price, Los Angeles Lakers (tie)

See also
1974 NBA Finals
1974 NBA playoffs
1973–74 ABA season

References